James Pindall (November 22, 1825) was a U.S. Representative from Virginia.

Born in Monongalia County, Virginia (now West Virginia), Pindall attended the common schools.
After studying law, he was admitted to the bar in 1803 and practiced in Morgantown.
Later, he moved to Clarksburg and continued the practice of his profession.
Over his lifetime, he held various official positions including serving in the State senate 1808–1812, being a colonel of militia, as well as, being elected as a Federalist to the Fifteenth and Sixteenth Congresses and served from March 4, 1817, until his resignation on July 26, 1820.
He died in Clarksburg, Virginia (now West Virginia), November 22, 1825 and was interred in what was known as the Daniel Davisson burial ground in Clarksburg, West Virginia.

Sources

1780s births
1825 deaths
Politicians from Clarksburg, West Virginia
Lawyers from Morgantown, West Virginia
Virginia lawyers
Virginia state senators
American militia officers
Federalist Party members of the United States House of Representatives from Virginia
19th-century American politicians
19th-century American lawyers
Politicians from Morgantown, West Virginia
Lawyers from Clarksburg, West Virginia